Dare House is an art deco building in Chennai, India which houses the offices of the Murugappa Group. Constructed between 1938 and 1940, it is named after William Dare, one of the partners of Parry & Co. from 1819 to 1838. The surrounding neighbourhood of Georgetown is more popularly known as Parry's Corner after EID Parry, the flagship company of the Murugappa Group.

History 

The site where the building now stands was part of Muthialpet where Comte de Lally positioned his cannons during his siege of Fort St. George in 1758-59. When the Carnatic Wars ended, Black Town which stood to the south of Muthialpet was levelled and a new esplanade or open space created to provide a clear field of view for the artillery in case of an attack. The frontiers of the esplanade were marked with six boundary markers, five of which have disappeared. The only one that has survived is now located within the precincts of Dare House.

John Call, chief engineer of the East India Company constructed a garden house, one of the earliest buildings at the spot. He later sold it to Muhammad Ali Khan Wallajah, the Nawab of the Carnatic.

Design
Dare House sports an emphasis on vertical lines and a distinct design of a 'sunburst jaali' for ventilation.

See also
 Parry’s Corner
 Murugappa Group
 George Town
 Heritage structures in Chennai

References 

 

Office buildings in Chennai